Capuchinos is a Caracas Metro station on Lines 2 and 4. The Line 2 station was opened on 6 November 1988 as part of the extension of the line from La Paz to El Silencio. The station is between El Silencio and Maternidad.

References

Caracas Metro stations
1988 establishments in Venezuela
Railway stations opened in 1988